Charles E. Arnt (August 20, 1906 – August 6, 1990) was an American film actor from 1933 to 1962. Arnt appeared as a character actor in more than 200 films. 

Arnt was born in Michigan City, Indiana, the son of a banker. He graduated from Phillips Academy and Princeton University. While at Princeton, he helped to found the University Players and was president of the Princeton Triangle Club theatrical troupe. He became a banker after he graduated from college.

In the early 1930s, Arnt acted with the University Repertory Theater in Maryland. On Broadway, he appeared in Carry Nation (1932), Three Waltzes (1937), and Knickerbocker Holiday (1938).

In 1962, Arnt retired from acting and began to import and breed Charolais cattle on a ranch in Washington state. Arnt died in Orcas Island, Washington from pancreatic and liver cancer. He was survived by his wife, two sons, a daughter, and four grandchildren.

Selected filmography

 Roman Scandals (1933) – Caius – the Food Taster (uncredited)
 Ladies Should Listen (1934) – Albert, the manservant
 Ready for Love (1934) – Sam Gardner
 Here Is My Heart (1934) – Higgins – Paul's Valet 
 Stolen Harmony (1935) – Clem Walters
 Two for Tonight (1935) – Benny
 She Married Her Boss (1935) – Victor Jessup
 The Witness Chair (1936) – Mr. Henshaw
 And Sudden Death (1936) – Archie Sloan
 Rhythm on the Range (1936) – Dining Car Steward (uncredited)
 Wedding Present (1936) – Reporter (uncredited)
 Sinner Take All (1936) – Lampier's Secretary (uncredited)
 Mind Your Own Business (1936) – Reporter (uncredited)
 College Holiday (1936) – Ticket Clerk (uncredited)
 After the Thin Man (1936) – Drunk Greeting Nick and Nora at Party (uncredited)
 Swing High, Swing Low (1937) – Georgie
 Angel's Holiday (1937) – Ralph Everett
 Mountain Music (1937) – Hotel Manager (uncredited)
 It Happened in Hollywood (1937) – Jed Reed
 Remember the Night (1940) – Tom
 The Shop Around the Corner (1940) – Policeman (uncredited)
 Grandpa Goes to Town (1940) – Movie Producer (uncredited)
 We Who Are Young (1940) – Eckman (uncredited)
 I Love You Again (1940) – Billings
 Little Men (1940) – Drunk in Medicine Show (uncredited)
 Dr. Kildare's Crisis (1940) – Mr. Stubbins, Man with Pain (uncredited)
 Play Girl (1941) – Grady (uncredited)
 Back Street (1941) – Mr. Mason (uncredited)
 Mr. District Attorney (1941) – Herman Winkle
 Pot o' Gold (1941) – Parks
 Tight Shoes (1941) – Lawyer Fenwick (uncredited)
 Blossoms in the Dust (1941) – G. Harrington Hedger
 Hello, Sucker (1941) – Studson (uncredited)
 Dressed to Kill (1941) – Hal Brennon
 Hold Back the Dawn (1941) – Mr. John MacAdams
 We Go Fast (1941) – Refrigerator Salesman
 Great Guns (1941) – Doctor
 Marry the Boss's Daughter (1941) – Blodgett
 Paris Calling (1941) – Lt. Lantz
 Ball of Fire (1941) – McNeary
 The Lady Has Plans (1942) – Pooly
 Young America (1942) – Principal Rice
 This Gun for Hire (1942) – Male Dressmaker
 My Gal Sal (1942) – Tailor
 Twin Beds (1942) – Manager
 Take a Letter, Darling (1942) – Fud Newton
 The Falcon's Brother (1942) – Pat Moffett (uncredited)
 That Other Woman (1942) – Bailey
 Pittsburgh (1942) – Building Site Laborer (uncredited)
 The Great Gildersleeve (1942) – Judge Horace Hooker
 Reunion in France (1942) – Honoré
 Gildersleeve's Bad Day (1943) – Judge Horace Hooker
 Henry Aldrich Swings It (1943) – Boyle
 Young Ideas (1943) – Station Master (uncredited)
 Gangway for Tomorrow (1943) – Jim Benson
 In Old Oklahoma (1943) – Joe – Train Conductor (uncredited)
 Up in Arms (1944) – Mr. Higginbotham
 Gambler's Choice (1944) – Honest John McGrady
 Once Upon a Time (1944) – Fred Stacy – Reporter (uncredited)
 The Seventh Cross (1944) – Herr Binder (uncredited)
 Three Little Sisters (1944) – Ezra Larkin
 The Impatient Years (1944) – Marriage Clerk (uncredited)
 My Pal Wolf (1944) – Papa Eisdaar
 Greenwich Village (1944) – Author with Letter (uncredited)
 Dangerous Passage (1944) – Daniel Bergstrom
 Double Exposure (1944) – Sonny Tucker
 Together Again (1944) – Clerk (uncredited)
 The Crime Doctor's Courage (1945) – Butler
 Without Love (1945) – Col. Braden (uncredited)
 Strange Illusion (1945) – Professor Muhlbach
 Sudan (1945) – Khafra
 Christmas in Connecticut (1945) – Homer Higgenbottom (uncredited)
 Dangerous Intruder (1945) – Max Ducone
 The Girl of the Limberlost (1945) – Hodges
 She Wouldn't Say Yes (1945) – Train Conductor (uncredited)
 Pardon My Past (1945) – Clothes Salesman
 Miss Susie Slagle's (1946) – Mr. Johnson
 Behind Green Lights (1946) – Daniel Boone Wintergreen (uncredited)
 Just Before Dawn (1946) – Attorney Allen S. Tobin (uncredited)
 Cinderella Jones (1946) – Mahoney
 The Hoodlum Saint (1946) – Cy Nolan – O'Neill's Secretary
 Blondie's Lucky Day (1946) – Mayor Richard Denby
 Without Reservations (1946) – Salesman
 Somewhere in the Night (1946) – Little Man with Glasses (uncredited)
 Big Town (1946) – Amos Peabody
 That Brennan Girl (1946) – Fred, Natalie's 2nd Husband
 Calendar Girl (1947) – Capt. Olsen
 That Way with Women (1947) – Harry Miller
 Fall Guy (1947) – Uncle Jim Grossett
 My Favorite Brunette (1947) – Crawford
 Saddle Pals (1947)  – William Schooler
 Big Town After Dark (1947) – Amos Peabody
 High Wall (1947) – Sidney X. Hackle
 Sitting Pretty (1948) – Mr. Taylor (uncredited)
 Big Town Scandal (1948) – Amos Peabody
 Michael O'Halloran (1948) – Doc Douglas Bruce
 Hollow Triumph (1948) – Coblenz
 The Boy with Green Hair (1948) – Mr. Hammond
 That Wonderful Urge (1948) – Mr. Bissell (uncredited)
 Boston Blackie's Chinese Venture (1949) – Pop Gerard
 Any Number Can Play (1949) – Joe Josephs (uncredited)
 Masked Raiders (1949) – Dr. W.J. Nichols
 Bride for Sale (1949) – Dobbs
 Wabash Avenue (1950) – Horace Carter
 He's a Cockeyed Wonder (1950) – J.B. Caldwell
 The Sun Sets at Dawn (1950) – Reporter, Globe Express
 The Man Who Cheated Himself (1950) – Ernest Quimby
 The Great Sioux Uprising (1953) – Gist
 The Veils of Bagdad (1953) – Zapolya
 Flood Tide (1958) – Mr. Appleby – Grocer
 A Nice Little Bank That Should Be Robbed (1958) – Mr. Simms aka Pop (uncredited)
 The Miracle of the Hills (1959) – Fuzzy
 Wild in the Country (1961) – Mr. Parsons (uncredited)
 Sweet Bird of Youth (1962) – Mayor Henricks)

References

External links

 
 
 

1906 births
1990 deaths
20th-century American male actors
American male film actors
Deaths from cancer in Washington (state)
Deaths from pancreatic cancer
Deaths from liver cancer
Male actors from Indiana
People from Michigan City, Indiana